Megachile rubrimana is a species of bee in the family Megachilidae. It was described by Morawitz in 1893.

References

Rubrimana
Insects described in 1893